Emil Antoni Ochyra (12 July 1936 – 26 May 1980) was a Polish fencer. He won a silver medal in the team sabre event at the 1960 Summer Olympics and a bronze in the same event at the 1964 Summer Olympics.

References

1936 births
1980 deaths
People from Przeworsk County
Polish male fencers
Olympic fencers of Poland
Fencers at the 1960 Summer Olympics
Fencers at the 1964 Summer Olympics
Fencers at the 1968 Summer Olympics
Olympic silver medalists for Poland
Olympic bronze medalists for Poland
Olympic medalists in fencing
Medalists at the 1960 Summer Olympics
Medalists at the 1964 Summer Olympics
Sportspeople from Podkarpackie Voivodeship
People from Lwów Voivodeship
Universiade medalists in fencing
Universiade silver medalists for Poland
Medalists at the 1959 Summer Universiade
20th-century Polish people